This is a list of the leading scorers in rugby union test matches.

Players currently active at international level are listed in bold; those not playing at international level but still active at club level are listed in italics.

Top 25 scoring international players (Tier 1)
Updated: 18 March 2023

Top ten scoring international players (Tier 2)

There are eight 'Tier 2' countries: Canada, Fiji, Japan, Georgia, Romania, Samoa, Tonga and the USA.

Updated: 3 September 2022

Top five scoring international players (Tier 3)

Updated: 13 November 2022

See also
 List of leading rugby union test try scorers
 List of leading international rugby union drop goal scorers
 List of rugby union test caps leaders
 International rugby union player records

References

External links
Scrum.com
BBC Sport

points
Point scorers